Bijnor Assembly constituency is one of the 403 constituencies of the Uttar Pradesh Legislative Assembly, India. It is a part of the Bijnor district and one of the five assembly constituencies in the Bijnor Lok Sabha constituency. First election in this assembly constituency was held in 1951 after the delimitation order (DPACO - 1951) was passed in 1951. The constituency was assigned identification number 22 after "Delimitation of Parliamentary and Assembly Constituencies Order, 2008" was passed in the year 2008.

Wards / Areas
Extent of Bijnor Assembly constituency is KC Mandawar, Bijnor, Dara Nagar, Mandawar NP, Jhalu NP & Bijnor MB of Bijnor Tehsil.

Members of the Legislative Assembly

Election results

2022

2017

2014

2012

See also

Bijnor Lok Sabha constituency
Bijnor district
Government of Uttar Pradesh
List of Vidhan Sabha constituencies of Uttar Pradesh
Sixteenth Legislative Assembly of Uttar Pradesh
Uttar Pradesh Legislative Assembly
Uttar Pradesh

References

External links
 

Bijnor
Assembly constituencies of Uttar Pradesh
Politics of Bijnor district